Darejan Dadiani, also known as Daria (20 July 1738 – 8 November 1807), was Queen Consort of Kakheti, and later Kartli-Kakheti in Eastern Georgia, as the third wife of King Erekle II (also known as Heraclius II). She was a daughter of Katsia-Giorgi Dadiani, a member of the princely house of Mingrelia. Darajan married Heraclius in 1750 and their marriage lasted 48 years until his death in 1798; the union produced 23 children. In the final years of her husband's reign, Darejan exerted significant influence on politics and court affairs. She was skeptical of the pro-Russian policies of Heraclius II and his successor, her step-son, George XII, whose progeny she tried to prevent from succeeding to the throne of Georgia. After the Russian annexation of Georgia, Queen Dowager Darejan was deported to Russia proper in 1803. She died in St. Petersburg at the age of 69 and was buried at the Alexander Nevsky Lavra.

Early life and marriage 
Darejan was a daughter of Prince Katsia-Giorgi Dadiani, a younger son of Bezhan Dadiani, Prince of Mingrelia in western Georgia. She was only 12 years old in 1750, when Heraclius, then reigning in Kakheti, chose her as his third wife, a year after his second wife, Princess Ana Abashidze, died. The marriage was negotiated on Heraclius's behalf by his relative, Princess Khoreshan, daughter of the late King of Kartli Jesse and wife of Prince Jesse Amilakhvari. The bride was brought by Khoreshan and Saba, Bishop of Ninotsminda, to Surami, where Heraclius met her. The wedding was then lavishly celebrated at the court of Heraclius's father, Teimuraz II, King of Kartli, in Tbilisi. In 1762, Heraclius of Kakheti succeeded on his father's death as king of Kartli, thus uniting both eastern Georgian kingdoms into a single state.

Issue of succession 
The couple's first better documented child, Princess Elene, was born in 1753, followed by 22 more between 1755 and 1782. As her sons grew up, Darejan's desire to secure the right of succession for her offspring against Heraclius's eldest surviving son of his second marriage to Anna Abashidze, the Crown Prince George, became the cornerstone of Darejan's involvement in the politics of Georgia. In the last years of Heraclius II's life, she became more involved and influential. In 1791, Darejan persuaded her husband to overturn the principle of primogeniture in favor of fraternal inheritance, mandating in his will that after his death, his eldest son George would become king, but that after George's death, the throne would pass to the next surviving son of Heraclius, rather than to George's offspring. The surviving sons of Heraclius and Darejan—Iulon, Vakhtang, Mirian, Alexander, and Parnaoz—thus, emerged in the line of succession. After Heraclius's death in 1798, the now King George XII, reneged on the will of the late king, declaring it invalid on account of it being forced upon his father. This occasioned a further breakdown in already strained relations between George XII and Darejan and his half-brothers.

Relations with Russia 
Another conflicting issue between Darejan and her reigning step-son was Georgia's relations with the Russian Empire. Darejan had been skeptical of Georgia's rapprochement with its northern neighbour already in Heraclius's lifetime, especially after the Russians, bound by the 1783 treaty of Georgievsk to protect Heraclius's kingdom from external threat, had left the Georgians to their own devices in the face of a disastrous invasion from Iran in 1795. The queen had repeatedly maintained that the relationship with Russia had brought no benefit to Georgia.

Darejan and her party were resolutely opposed to George XII's renewed quest for the Russian protection. In 1800, one of Darejan's sons, Alexander, openly broke with his half-brother and attempted a coup with the help of his Avar and Iranian allies. The relations in the royal family hit the nadir in July 1800, when George XII forced Queen Dowager Darejan into confinement at her palace in Avlabari, prompting Darejan's sons to mobilize their loyal forces around Tbilisi.

Downfall and exile 

After the death of George XII in December 1800, the Russian general Ivan Lazarev issued the Tsar Paul I's order to all the members of the royal family, beginning with Darejan, forbidding the nomination of any heir to the throne. After Paul's death in March 1801, Darejan applied to the new tsar, Alexander I, to confirm her eldest son, Iulon, as the new king and protect her and her kin from harassment from George XII's heir Prince David and his supporters. However, the Russian government proceeded with the outright annexation of the Georgian kingdom, bringing the millennium of the Bagratid rule in Georgia to an end.

The Queen Dowager and her sons withdrew into opposition to the new regime; Iulon, Alexander, and Parnaoz were now in open rebellion. Darejan's every trip outside Tbilisi was closely watched by the Russian military. Eventually, Tsar Alexander ordered the commander in Georgia, General Karl Knorring, to deport all members of the royal family from Georgia for resettlement in Russia proper on 20 August 1802. The State Council confirmed the decision and instructed Knorring to "strengthen all measures for the transport of Queen Darejan and other members of the royal family to Russia, because their presence in Georgia will always be a cause and reason [for the development of] parties hostile" to the Russian hegemony. Darejan's relations with Knorring were particularly tense. Once, the general angered her by wearing his hat and coat at her house and interrupting an interview at noon, declaring it was time for his vodka.

The task of deportation was to be fulfilled by Knorring's successor, General Pavel Tsitsianov, himself of Georgian origin. In vain Darejan cited her illness to avoid exile. Tsitsianov responded that no reason would postpone her departure. She was further accused of "treasonous" correspondence with Russia's enemies and removing the venerated icon of Ancha from a church in Tbilisi. The Russian military had Darejan escorted on 25 October 1803 out of the estate of her grandson in Mukhrani to her exile in Russia.

Darejan, known to the Russians as the tsaritsa Darya Georgyevna, was allowed to settle down in St. Petersburg, where she lived in a rented house in the parish of the Church of St. Simon and Anna. Later, the ailing queen was permitted to have a house church, which was consecrated on 22 July 1804 and closed following the death of Darejan on 8 November 1807. Darejan, Queen Dowager of Georgia and Lady of the Russian Order of St. Catherine, Grand Cross, was buried at the Annunciation Church of the Alexander Nevsky Lavra.

Children 

Darejan had 23 children with Heraclius. Of these, only 13 reached adulthood.

 Prince Solomon (died 1765)
 Princess Elene (1753–1786)
 Princess Mariam (1755–1828)
 Princess Sophia (born c. 1756, died in childhood)
 Prince Levan (1756–1781)
 Prince Ioane (born c. 1759, died in childhood)
 Prince Iulon (1760–1816)
 Prince Vakhtang (Almaskhan) (1761–1814)
 Princess Salome (born 1761, died in childhood)
 Prince Beri (born 1761 or 1762, died in childhood)
 Prince Teimuraz (1762–1827)
 Princess Anastasia (1763–1838)
 Princess Ketevan (1764–1840)
 Prince Soslan-David (c. 1764–1767)
 Prince Mirian (1767–1834)
 Princess Khoreshan (born 1768, died in childhood)
 Prince Alexander (1770–1844)
 Prince Luarsab (born 1772, died in childhood)
 Princess Ekaterine (1774–1818)
 Princess Tekle (1776–1846)
 Prince Parnaoz (1777–1852)
 Prince Archil (born 1780, died in childhood)
 Aslamaz-Khan (born 1782, died in childhood)

Ancestry

See also
 List of people with the most children

Notes

References 

 

|-

1738 births
1807 deaths
Darejan
Queens consort from Georgia (country)
18th-century people from Georgia (country)
19th-century people from Georgia (country)
18th-century women from Georgia (country)
19th-century women from Georgia (country)
Burials at the Annunciation Church of the Alexander Nevsky Lavra
Queens consort of Kakheti